Ulrike Tauber (born 16 June 1958) is a retired medley and butterfly swimmer from East Germany, who won the gold medal in the women's 400 m individual medley at the 1976 Summer Olympics in Montreal, Quebec, Canada. There she also captured the silver medal in the women's 200 m butterfly. In the 1970s Tauber set numerous world records in the 200 m and 200 m individual medley.

See also
 List of members of the International Swimming Hall of Fame

References

1958 births
Living people
East German female swimmers
East German female butterfly swimmers
East German female medley swimmers
Olympic swimmers of East Germany
Swimmers at the 1976 Summer Olympics
Swimmers at the 1980 Summer Olympics
Olympic gold medalists for East Germany
Olympic silver medalists for East Germany
World record setters in swimming
World Aquatics Championships medalists in swimming
European Aquatics Championships medalists in swimming
Medalists at the 1976 Summer Olympics
Sportspeople from Chemnitz
Olympic gold medalists in swimming
Olympic silver medalists in swimming
Recipients of the Patriotic Order of Merit in silver